Hu Hong (1105-1161), courtesy name Renzhong (仁仲), born in Chong'an (崇安县) in Fujian province, was a Confucian scholar during the Song Dynasty. He studied the Cheng School of philosophy.

References

1105 births
1161 deaths
12th-century Chinese philosophers

Philosophers from Fujian